The Zielona Góra Voivodeship was a voivodeship (province) of the Polish People's Republic from 1975 to 1989, and the Third Republic of Poland from 1989 to 1998. Its capital was Zielona Góra, and it was centered on the southern Lubusz Land, in west-centre part of the county. It was established on 1 June 1975, from the part of the Zielona Góra Voivodeship, and existed until 31 December 1998, when it was incorporated into then-established Lubusz and Greater Poland Voivodeships.

History 
The Zielona Góra was established on 1 June 1975, as part of the administrative reform, and was one of the voivodeships (provinces) of the Polish People's Republic. It was formed from the part of the territory of the Zielona Góra Voivodeship. Its capital was located in the city of Zielona Góra. In 1975, it was inhabited by 580 000 people.

On 9 December 1989, the Polish People's Republic was replaced by the Third Republic of Poland. It existed until 31 December 1998, when most of its territory being incorporated into then-established Lubusz Voivodeship, with some additionally being incorporated into the Greater Poland Voivodeship.

Subdivisions 

In 1997, the voivodeship was divided into 57 gminas (municipalities), including 7 urban municipalities, 21 urban-rural municipalities, and 29 rural municipalities. It had 28 cities and towns.

From 1990 to 1998, it was additionally divided into six district offices, each comprising several municipalities.

Demographics

Population

Settlements 
In 1997, the voivodeship had 28 cities and towns. In 1998, the biggest cities and towns by population were:
Zielona Góra (118 182);
Nowa Sól (42 662);
Żary (40 732);
Żagań (28 170);
Świebodzin (22 539);
Gubin (18 893);
Sulechów (18 250);
Lubsko (15 511);
Wolsztyn (13 879);
Szprotawa (13 139);
Krosno Odrzańskie (13 000);
Kożuchów (9 967);
Zbąszyń (7 500);
Zbąszynek (5 100);
Iłowa (4 100);
Sława (4000).

Symbols 
The voivodeship had addopped its flag and coat of arms on 18 July 1985. The coat of arms had a red Norman style escutcheon (shield) with square top and acute base. Inside the shield was featured a white (silver) eagle with elevated wings, and a green figure in a shape of the borders of the voivodeship, with two blue rivers featured on it: Oder and Lusatian Neisse. Its flag was a rectangle divided horizontally into two stripes, a yellow one on the top, and a green one on the bottom.

Leaders 
The leader of the administrative division was the voivode. Those were:
 1975–1980: Jan Lembas;
 1980–1982: Zbigniew Cyganik;
 1982–1984: Walerian Mikołajczak;
 1984–1990: Zbyszko Piwoński;
 1990–1993: Jarosław Barańczak;
 1993–1997: Marian Eckert;
 1997–1998: Marian Miłek.

Citations

Notes

References 

Former voivodeships of Poland (1975–1998)
Voivodeship, Zielona Gora, 1975-1998
States and territories established in 1975
States and territories disestablished in 1998
1975 establishments in Poland
1998 disestablishments in Poland